Harold Peter Burke (June 6, 1895 – July 17, 1981) was a United States district judge of the United States District Court for the Western District of New York from 1937 to 1981 and its Chief Judge from 1955 to 1967.

Education and career
Born in Rochester, New York, Burke received a Bachelor of Laws from Notre Dame Law School in 1916. He enlisted in the United States Army in October 1917 and was discharged in July 1919 as a corporal with Company B, 15th Machine Gun Battalion. After serving in the army, he was in private practice in Rochester from 1920 to 1931. He was an assistant state attorney general of New York from 1931 to 1934, and was corporate counsel for the City of Rochester from 1934 to 1937.

Federal judicial service
On April 27, 1937, Burke was nominated by President Franklin D. Roosevelt to a seat on the United States District Court for the Western District of New York vacated by Judge Harlan W. Rippey. Burke was confirmed by the United States Senate on June 15, 1937, and received his commission on June 18, 1937. He served as Chief Judge from 1955 to 1967, and assumed senior status on June 15, 1981, the 44th anniversary of his Senate confirmation to the bench. One of Roosevelt's longest-serving appointees and the last federal judge in active service in the position FDR appointed him to, Burke died on July 17, 1981, in Rochester, just over a month after stepping down. He is buried at Saint Anne's Roman Catholic Cemetery, Palmyra, New York.

See also
List of United States federal judges by longevity of service

Notes

References

Sources

1895 births
1981 deaths
20th-century American judges
Judges of the United States District Court for the Western District of New York
United States Army non-commissioned officers
United States district court judges appointed by Franklin D. Roosevelt